Mikuláš Krnáč (born 15 February 1947) is a Slovak footballer. He competed in the men's tournament at the 1968 Summer Olympics.

References

External links
 

1947 births
Living people
Slovak footballers
Czechoslovak footballers
Olympic footballers of Czechoslovakia
Footballers at the 1968 Summer Olympics
People from Lučenec District
Sportspeople from the Banská Bystrica Region
Association football forwards
FK Inter Bratislava players